Ricardo Marín Sánchez (born 18 March 1998) is a Mexican professional footballer who plays as a forward.

Club career

América 
Marín made his professional debut for Club América on February 18, 2017, against Guadalajara when he was subbed on in 63rd minute in América's 1–0 loss. The following week, he replaced Oribe Peralta in the 86th minute of the 2–0 win against Cruz Azul.

References

External links

1998 births
Living people
Mexican footballers
Mexico youth international footballers
Association football forwards
Club América footballers
Club Necaxa footballers
Club Celaya footballers
Liga MX players
Ascenso MX players
Footballers from Mexico City